Marika Kilius (born 24 March 1943) is a German former pair skater. With Hans-Jürgen Bäumler, she is a two-time Olympic silver medalist, a two-time World champion, and a six-time European champion. Earlier in her career, she competed with Franz Ningel.

Personal life
Marika Kilius, the daughter of a hairdresser, was born on 24 March 1943 in Frankfurt am Main, Hessen. In 1964, she married Werner Zahn, the son of a factory owner from Frankfurt am Main. The couple divorced, and Kilius also divorced her second husband. She has two children, Sascha and Melanie Schäfer, and as of May 2005, two grandchildren.

Career
Kilius began as a singles skater but picked up pairs very early. Her first partner was Franz Ningel. They placed fourth at the 1956 Olympics and won the silver medal at the 1957 World Championships. Kilius was still a child when she was paired with Ningel, who was more than six years her senior. By 1957 she had grown to be taller than her partner, which caused problems on their lifts, so the team split up.

For a time following her split with Ningel, Kilius competed in artistic roller skating as a singles skater. She was the World Roller ladies' champion in 1958.

Meanwhile, in 1957, Kilius began skating with Hans-Jürgen Bäumler under the tutelage of Erich Zeller. Between 1958 and 1964, they won the German Championships four times, European Championships six times and the World Championships two times. Their first World title, in 1963, followed cancellation of the 1961 event due to the crash of Sabena Flight 548 and a collision during their performance at the 1962 World Figure Skating Championships that forced them to withdraw.

Kilius and Baumler also captured the silver medal at the Olympics twice, in 1960 and 1964. The skaters had signed professional contracts and skated as professionals with Holiday on Ice before the 1964 Olympics, a violation of their amateur status and strict IOC rules. In 1966, because the team had signed a professional skating contract before the 1964 Winter Olympics – against the rules at the time – they were stripped of the medal. As the New York Times reported, "prodded by two German members, the IOC "quietly re-awarded the West Germans their silver medals in 1987, 23 years after the Innsbruck Games, at an executive board meeting in Istanbul. The couple was deemed 'rehabilitated.'"

Kilius was voted the German female athlete of the year in 1959.

Results

Pairs with Franz Ningel

Pairs with Hans-Jürgen Bäumler

References

External links

 Who is who.de
 Olympia Lexikon.de
 HR (German TV Station)

1943 births
Living people
German female pair skaters
Olympic figure skaters of the United Team of Germany
Olympic silver medalists for the United Team of Germany
Olympic medalists in figure skating
Figure skaters at the 1956 Winter Olympics
Figure skaters at the 1960 Winter Olympics
Figure skaters at the 1964 Winter Olympics
Medalists at the 1960 Winter Olympics
Medalists at the 1964 Winter Olympics
World Figure Skating Championships medalists
European Figure Skating Championships medalists
Sportspeople from Frankfurt